Francisco Anacleto Louçã (born 12 November 1956 in Lisbon) is a Portuguese economist and politician.

Biography
He is the second son of António Seixas Louçã, a Portuguese Navy Officer, and his wife Noémia da Rocha Neves Anacleto, lawyer, granddaughter of António Neves Anacleto, from Silves, brother of Isabel Maria, António, João Carlos and Jorge Manuel, and cousin of Vítor Gaspar, former Minister of Finances at the right winged Pedro Passos Coelho's government.

Louçã was an active opponent of the pre-democracy regime. He was arrested for a protest against the colonial war in 1972, before the fall of the dictatorship, which lasted in Portugal for about forty years and finished with the Carnation Revolution, (25 April 1974). In 1999, after pursuing his academic career, he helped found the left-wing party Left Bloc (Portuguese: Bloco de Esquerda).

Career 
He is a Full Professor of Economics in Lisbon's Instituto Superior de Economia e Gestão ("Higher Institute of Economics and Management"), which belongs to the University of Lisbon (formerly Technical University of Lisbon) and was a member of the Portuguese Parliament from 1999 to 2012.

He is the author of several books and scientific articles on the history of economic thought, the dynamics of complex adaptive systems and the nature of long-term techno-economic change, including "Turbulence in Economics" (Elgar, 1997), "As Time Goes By" (with Christopher Freeman, Oxford University Press, 2011 and 2002, translated into Portuguese, Chinese), "The Years of High Econometrics" (Routledge, 2007) and a number of papers in scientific journals in economics, mathematical physics, history of economic ideas, mathematical modeling of financial markets, history of biology. His scientific books are translated into eleven languages. In 1999 he was awarded the prize for the best scientific paper of the year, "History of Economics Association" (ref. Google Books).

Candidate in the Portuguese 2006 presidential elections, Louçã received 288,224 votes (5.31%).

Francisco Louçã is one of the five personalities elected by the Assembly of the Republic to the Council of State on 18 December 2015, and he took office on 12 January 2016,  serving until 2022. He is also the first (and so far only) member of Left Bloc to accede to this body.

2006 Portuguese presidential election

Francisco Louçã finished fifth with 292,198 votes (5.32%).

References

1956 births
Living people
Candidates for President of Portugal
Left Bloc politicians
People from Lisbon
20th-century Portuguese economists
Technical University of Lisbon alumni